I Hate Mondays may refer to:

 "I Hate Mondays" (song), a 2009 song by Newton Faulkner
 I Hate Mondays (film), a 1971 Polish film
 "I Hate Mondays", a 1991 episode of Dark Justice

See also
"I Don't Like Mondays", a 1979 song by The Boomtown Rats